Wolf Rock! is the debut studio album of Japanese rock band Guitar Wolf, released in the U.S. on vinyl LP in 1993 and in Japan on CD in July 1995. The band claims that the reason it sounds messy is because they recorded it in their lead singer, Seiji's, basement.

Track listing
 "Wolf Rock"
 "Ace of Spades"
 "Indian Guitar"
 "Apache Leather"
 "Red Rockabilly"
 "Mars Twist"
 "Shooting Star Noise"
 "J Jupiter Joan"
 "Machine Gun Guitar"
 "Jack the Ripper"
 "Rumble" (Unlisted)
 "Gloria"

1993 debut albums
Guitar Wolf albums